MV A1C William H. Pitsenbarger was a civilian-crewed container ship operated by Red River Shipping Corp. of Rockville, Maryland, under charter to Military Sealift Command from 2001 to 2008. She was named in honor of William H. Pitsenbarger, a US Air Force Medal of Honor recipient.

According to the Naval Vessel Register, A1C William H. Pitsenbarger was disposed of by return to owner on 29 August 2008.

References

External links
 
 Globalsecurity.org : T-AK 4638 A1C William H. Pitsenbarger
 Military Sealift Command: Factsheet on Container Ships -T-AK

1983 ships
Container ships of the United States Navy
Merchant ships of France
Ships built in France